The river Sense (locally  ) is a right tributary of the river Saane in Switzerland. It is a border river between the Cantons of Fribourg and Bern. Its source rivers, the Kalte Sense, coming from Mount Gantrisch, and Warme Sense, flowing out of lake Schwarzsee, join at Zollhaus and thus form the origin of the Sense.

The Sense flows through a gorge of 15 km length, which is popular for whitewater sports, but also for swimming and bathing – especially among nudists. Its main tributary is the river Schwarzwasser.

After about 35 km, the Sense joins the Saane river at Laupen. Because the Sense's water level can rise rapidly during hefty rainstorms, it is dangerous to stay near the river bed in uncertain weather conditions.

References

Rivers of Switzerland
Bern–Fribourg border
Rivers of the canton of Bern
Rivers of the canton of Fribourg
1Sense